Angostura Dam may refer to:

Angostura Dam (U.S.), on the Cheyenne River
Angostura Dam (Mexico), on the Grijalva River
Angostura Dam (Chile), on the Bío Bío River
Angostura Dam (Costa Rica), on the Reventazón River
Angostura Diversion Dam, New Mexico